Outram Bangs (January 12, 1863 – September 22, 1932) was an American zoologist.

Biography
Bangs was born in Watertown, Massachusetts, as the second son of Edward and Annie Outram (Hodgkinson) Bangs. He studied at Harvard from 1880 to 1884, and became Curator of Mammals at the Harvard Museum of Comparative Zoology in 1900.

He died at his summer home at Wareham, Massachusetts.

Works
The Florida Deer Proceedings of the Biological Society of Washington 10:25–28 (1896)
The hummingbirds of the Santa Marta Region of Colombia American Ornithologists' Union, New York (1899)
The Florida Puma Proceedings of the Biological Society of Washington 13:15–17. (1899)
The Mammals and Birds of the Pearl Islands, Bay of Panama Harvard University Museum of Comparative Zoology, Bulletin 46 (8) : 137–160 (1905) with John Eliot Thayer
Notes on the Birds and Mammals of the Arctic Coast of East Siberia New England Zoological Club, Proceedings, 5 : 1–66 (1914) with Glover Morrill Allen and J. E. Thayer
A Collection of Birds from the Cayman Islands Harvard University Museum of Comparative Zoology, Bulletin 60:301–320 (1916)

Associated eponyms
Bangsia – Tanager genus
Grallaria bangsi – Santa Marta antpitta
Syntheosciurus brochus – Bangs's mountain squirrel

References

External links
 
 

American ornithologists
American taxonomists
1863 births
1932 deaths
Harvard University alumni
Harvard University staff
People from Watertown, Massachusetts
19th-century American zoologists
20th-century American zoologists